Falls City High School is a public high school in Falls City, Oregon, United States. It is the only high school in the Falls City School District.

History
The current school building was built in 1921.

Academics
In 2008, 53% of the school's seniors received their high school diploma. Of 19 students, 10 graduated, 2 dropped out, 1 received a modified diploma, and 6 are still in high school.

In 2009, the school changed to a "proficiency model" as part the Race to the Top program of the Department of Education. Student grades are based on subject-area competency, instead of test scores and homework grades.

References

High schools in Polk County, Oregon
Public high schools in Oregon